Abidur Reza Khan (22 September 1927 – 3 September 2005) was a Bangladesh Awami League politician. In 1946, while he was attending Rajendra College, where he met Bangabandhu and begun his student politics. He was the first Faridpur District Muslim/student League President. 1952, he played a major role during the Vasha Andolon. In 1964, Bangabandhu gave him the responsibility to organize the lawyers at the Supreme Court.  In 1966, during struggle against Pakistan, he assisted Bangabandhu with the Six Points Programme of the Awami League. In 1968 during the Agartala Conspiracy Case, Abidur Reza Khan was one of the first lawyer who did not care for his life and represented Bangabandhu. He was elected MNA 1970. In 1971, April 20, General Tikka Khan ordered Abidur Reza Khan along with Nazrul Islam, Tazzuddin Ahmad, Abdul Mannan, and Tofael Ahmed to surrender for treason.

Birth and early life 
Abidur Reza Khan was born on 22 September 1927 in Bhedarganj Upazila of Shariatpur District.

Career 
He was a supreme court lawyer since 1964, and was elected MNA in 1970.  Later, Abidur Reza Khan was elected to parliament from Undivided Faridpur-18 (present Shariatpur-3) as a Bangladesh Awami League candidate in 1973. He was elected a member of parliament from Bhedarganj Upazila-Gosairhat Upazila Constituency as By-election 1981. He has served as the baksal district governor of Madaripur District 1975. Under Sheikh Hasina's leadership, 1982, Abidur Reza Khan organized the Awami League in the greater Madaripu and later became the founding President of the Shariatpur Distract Awami League  and remain as the district president until his death in 2005.

Death 
Abidur Reza Khan died on 3 September 2005 Samorita Hospital, Dhaka, Bangladesh. Prime Minister Sheikh Hasina visited Elephant Road and paid her tribute to late Awami League leader Abidur Reza Khan

References 

1927 births
2005 deaths
People from Shariatpur District
Awami League politicians
University of Dhaka alumni
20th-century Bengalis